The second season of Criminal Minds premiered on CBS on September 20, 2006, and ended on May 16, 2007. Lola Glaudini left the show after six episodes and was replaced by Paget Brewster three episodes later while Kirsten Vangsness was promoted to series regular.

Cast

Main 
 Mandy Patinkin as Supervisory Special Agent Jason Gideon (BAU Senior Agent)
 Thomas Gibson as Supervisory Special Agent Aaron "Hotch" Hotchner (BAU Unit Chief)
 Lola Glaudini as Supervisory Special Agent Elle Greenaway (BAU Agent) Ep. 1-6
 Paget Brewster as Supervisory Special Agent Emily Prentiss (BAU Agent) Ep. 9-23
 Shemar Moore as Supervisory Special Agent Derek Morgan (BAU Agent)
 Matthew Gray Gubler as Supervisory Special Agent Dr. Spencer Reid (BAU Agent)
 A. J. Cook as Supervisory Special Agent Jennifer "JJ" Jareau (BAU Communications Liaison)
 Kirsten Vangsness as Special Agent Penelope Garcia (BAU Technical Analyst)

Special guest stars 
 Jobeth Williams as Ursula Kent
 Keith Carradine as Frank Breitkopf
 James Van Der Beek as Tobias Hankel
 Kate Jackson as Ambassador Elizabeth Prentiss

Recurring 
 Meredith Monroe as Haley Hotchner
 Jane Lynch as Diana Reid
 Josh Stewart as William "Will" LaMontagne Jr.
 Jayne Atkinson as Supervisory Special Agent Erin Strauss (BAU Section Chief)
 Skipp Sudduth as Stan Gordinski

Guest stars 

In the season premiere "The Fisher King (Part II)", Jeff Marchelletta guest-starred as Elle Greenaway's deceased father, Robert, in a dream sequence while Elle is in surgery. In the episode "P911", Mary Page Keller guest-starred as Supervisory Special Agent Katherine Cole, a former BAU Agent who is now the Unit Chief of the Crimes Against Children Unit, and is investigating a young boy who is at risk of being sold to a pedophile in an online auction. John Rubinstein guest-starred as Principal Hayden Rawlings, a pedophile and one of the bidders for the auction, despite claiming that he tried to rescue the boy from his captor. In the episode "The Perfect Storm", Nicki Aycox guest-starred as Amber Canardo, a rape victim who abducts and murders women. Her partner in crime is her husband, Tony Canardo, played by Brad Rowe.

 
In the episode "Psychodrama", Jason Wiles guest-starred as Caleb Dale Sheppard, aka "The Stripping Bandit", a meth-addicted bank robber who forces bystanders to strip naked. In the episode "Aftermath", Jason London guest-starred as William Lee, a serial rapist who impregnates his victims, and is later murdered by Elle Greenaway. Dahlia Salem guest-starred as Detective Maggie Callahan, who leads the investigation of the rapes. In the episode "The Boogeyman", Elle Fanning guest-starred as Tracy Belle, an elementary school student who is nearly murdered by child killer Jeffrey Charles, played by Cameron Monaghan. Sean Bridgers guest-starred as Jeffrey's father, James, who was the prime suspect in the murders.

In the episode "North Mammon", Mimi Michaels guest-starred as Brooke Chambers, a soccer jock who, along with her two best friends, is abducted, and are forced to choose which one of them will be murdered. Kelly Kruger guest-starred as Kelly Seymour, the one who eventually dies. In the episode "Empty Planet", Jamie Elman guest-starred as Kenneth Roberts, a serial bomber who goes by the alias of "Allegro", the main character from his favorite science fiction novel. JoBeth Williams guest-starred as Ursula Kent, a Professor who is held hostage by Kenneth. In the episode "The Last Word", Jason O'Mara guest-starred as The Mill Creek Killer, a serial killer competing against The Hollow Man for recognition for their crimes. 

In the episode "Lessons Learned" Anthony Azizi guest-starred as Jamal Abaza, a Guantanamo Bay inmate who is a member of a terrorist organization called "Militant Islamic Society." Kevin Chapman  guest-starred as FBI Agent Andrew Bingham, who aids the BAU in preventing an attempted bombing at a newly opened mall. In the episode "Sex, Birth, Death", Jessica Tuck guest-starred as Dr. Sarah Harris, a doctor who is desperate to help stop her son's homicidal urges and fantasies. In the episode "Profiler, Profiled", Erica Gimpel guest-starred as Sarah Morgan, Derek Morgan's elder sister.

 

In the episode "No Way Out", Keith Carradine guest-starred as one of the series most notorious criminals, Frank Breitkopf. Amy Madigan guest-starred as Frank's love interest, Jane Hanratty. In the episodes "The Big Game" and "Revelations", James Van Der Beek guest-starred as Tobias Hankel, a delusional serial killer who is following in the footsteps of his father Charles. Cullen Douglas guest-starred as Dr. Tony Wilson. In the episode "Distress", Holt McCallany guest-starred as Roy Woodridge, a former U.S. Army Ranger who suffers delusional visions of people who appear to him as Somali soldiers. Nick Chinlund guest-starred as Max Weston. In the episode "Jones", Simone Kessell guest-starred as Sarah Danlin, a Jack the Ripper copycat who was once helped by William LaMontagne, Jr.'s father before she became a killer. 

 

In the episode "Honor Among Thieves", Kate Jackson guest-starred as Emily Prentiss' mother, Elizabeth, who aids the BAU in searching for a missing Russian immigrant. In the episode "Open Season", Jim Parrack and Jake Richardson guest-starred as Paul and Johnny Mulford, a pair of brothers who kidnap and hunt several people in the woods. Laura Allen guest-starred as Bobbi Baird, a woman who is abducted and hunted by the Mulford brothers. In the season finale "No Way Out II: The Evilution of Frank", Keith Carradine and Amy Madigan reprise as Frank Breitkopf and Jane Hanratty, respectively. Elle Fanning reprises as Tracy Belle, who is abducted by Frank.

Episodes

Home media

References

External links

Criminal Minds
2006 American television seasons
2007 American television seasons